Okechukwu Nwadiuto Emuchay  (born 9 November 1960), also referred to as "Okey Emuchay," is a diplomat and formerly Nigeria's Consul-General to South Africa.

Early life
Ambassador Emuchay (MFR) was born in Aba on November 9, 1960 to the late Sir (Dr) Dick Waobianyi Emuchay (MFR) and Lady (Mrs.) Christiana Nne Emuchay (Ada Ugo Abia) of Azumini, Ndoki in Ukwa East LGA, Abia State. He was one of eight children. Okey Emuchay's father, Sir D. W. Emuchay, was a medical doctor and administrator who was born in 1919 in Abak, in today’s Akwa Ibom State. 

Emuchay attended primary school in Aba, then attended Government College, Umuahia; King’s College, Lagos; and Higher College, Yaba. He taught biology at the Igbobi College, Yaba before proceeding to St. Andrews University Scotland and Liverpool School of Tropical Medicine. He is a graduate of the prestigious University of Nigeria Nsukka.  He practised medicine briefly in the United Kingdom both as a general practitioner and house surgeon before relocating back to Nigeria.

On his return to Nigeria, he became the Senior House Surgeon and Medical Officer in Charge of Rural Areas, Aba between 1955 and 1959. He served as Medical Officer in Charge of General Hospital Degema in today’s Rivers State between 1958 and 1959. In 1961, he established a 180-bed cottage hospital in Azumini, his home town, and became its medical superintendent. The hospital played an important role during the Nigerian civil war and thereafter. The hospital was the love of his life and later his son Dr. Chika Emuchay established the Group Medical Practice (GMP) at No.1 Emuchay Close at Ogbor Hill at Aba was an adjunct and support to Cottage Hospital Azumini. After the civil war, Dr. Emuchay became the chairman of the East Central State Public Service Commission between 1972 and 1976. When Imo State was carved out and he moved over to the new state to perform the same function till in 1982. He left that position to become the first pro-chancellor and chairman of the governing council of Imo State University (now Abia State University, Uturu) until 1985.

The federal government of Nigeria recognized his contributions to nation building in 1986 through the most deserved conferment of the Member of the Federal Republic (MFR).

Career and national service
Until his voluntary retirement, Emuchay served in Nigeria's foreign service for 31 years. He  was the award-winning Nigeria’s Consul-General in Johannesburg, South Africa. As a career diplomat, he had previously served in Angola, United Kingdom and Austria. His tour of duty in Johannesburg commenced at a turbulent time when nations were adjusting their foreign policies to post-apartheid South Africa. However, he proved his mettle by bringing a new dimension to citizen diplomacy and navigated Nigeria’s national interest and aspirations through these challenging moments, guiding her to resolve many knotty issues that would have ruined the significant Nigeria-South African relations. Emuchay (MFR) played a pivotal role in not just bridge building but in guiding policy and national responses to the issues and manifestations of xenophobia in post-apartheid South Africa, especially where it took the form of attacks to Nigerians and Nigerian interests in South Africa. He helped resolve many other diplomatic-cum-political rows like the one involving the unlawful repatriation of Nigerians.

He is considered one of the most accomplished Nigerian diplomats, for which he received the National Award of Member of the Federal Republic (MFR) in 2012 from President Goodluck Jonathan. It is said that Emuchay was one of the most respected diplomats in the Southern African Development Community (SADC) Region. 

In 2013, while Nigeria's Consul-General in South Africa, he received the Community Service Award from the Nigerian Community in South Africa. Emuchay's citation for the award stated: "The CG as he is fondly called is a man of the people. Combining diplomatic and political sagacity, the CG has contributed tremendously in alleviating difficulties faced by Nigerians in South Africa. His administrative skills have helped with challenges of getting or renewing Nigerian passports in South Africa. While, he has never shied from calling to order erring Nigerians, Mr. Emuchay has never failed to speak up for upstanding Nigerians whose rights are violated in South Africa. The CG has also on most occasions provided needed assistance to seek redress for such Nigerians and as well as engaging with relevant authorities."

After his voluntary retirement from Nigeria's foreign service, he declared interest to contest the 2015 governorship election in Abia State.

Personal life
He is married to Mrs. Jane Okey Emuchay.

References

External links 
 Abia Next Level

1960 births
Living people
Members of the Order of the Federal Republic
Government College Umuahia alumni
Alumni of the University of St Andrews
Alumni of the University of Liverpool
King's College, Lagos alumni
University of Nigeria alumni
People from Aba, Abia
Nigerian diplomats
Abia State University people